Chrome orange is a mixed oxide with the chemical formula  Pb2CrO5. It can be made by treating a lead(II) salt with an alkaline solution of a chromate or by treating chrome yellow (PbCrO4) with strongly basic solution.

Synthesis and nanoparticles
Pb2CrO5 can be synthesized with a gas-liquid precipitation process. Changing the pH controls whether PbCrO4 or Pb2CrO5 is created.

Orthorhombic nanocrystals can be selectively synthesized in a facile room temperature solution for Pb2CrO5.

Using a microwave-assisted ionic liquid (MAIL) method, bundle and rod-like nanocrystals of Pb2CrO5 were formed. The bundles look like bundles of straw, secured in the middle. In basic solution, single-crystalline Pb2CrO5 could be formed by heating lead acetate and potassium dichromate with microwave radiation for only 10 minutes at 90 celsius. The MAIL process is simple, fast, and does not employ surfactants. The presence of hydroxide changes the phase that is formed. Using NaOH, monoclinic Pb2CrO5 is formed. The bundle and rod-shaped structures are sensitive to electron beam irradiation, which will turn them into many small particles.

Properties
The Gibbs free energy of Pb2CrO5 was determined in 2010 and is given as

ΔfG°mPb2CrO5(s)±0.30/(kJ•mol−1)=-1161.3 +0.4059(T/K) (859≤T/K≤1021).

Visible light activity up to 550 nanometers has been recorded for Pb2CrO5.

Pigment synthesis
In an catalog published c. 1835, Winsor and Newton paint company identify ten synthetic pathways for producing chrome orange, also called deep yellow. Chrome orange is made of PbCrO4 mixed with basic lead chromate (Pb2CrO5). It has been described as a “yellowish red or sometimes a beautiful deep red” in alkaline conditions. A deep yellow can be created using PbCrO4 and lead sulfate. There are ten synthetic methods for preparing deep chrome yellow (that made with Pb2CrO5), which require a chromate source, a basic lead source, additives, and a sulfate source. CrO42- + H2SO4+Pb(Ac)2 • 2Pb(OH)2 → PbCrO4+Pb2CrO5 at a pH of approximately seven is the synthesis.

Controlling the pH was Winsor and Newton’s method for creating pigments from the pale yellow to the deep chrome orange. The resulting product has a high stability to light, which is always coveted by artists and collectors.

History
The natural mineral crocoite was discovered in 1797 by Louis Vauquelin and chrome orange was synthesized as a pigment for the first time in 1809.  Pb2CrO5 is found in mineral form as phoenicochroite, which is a monoclinic, red, translucent mineral found in various places across the world, including Russia, the USA, and Chile.

Use as a pigment

Chrome orange can range in color from light to deep orange and is no longer in production as a pigment. It has also been known as Derby red, Persian red, and Victoria red. It was first recorded as a pigment in 1809 and was perfect for some impressionist painters in the nineteenth century. The yellow-orange pigment of the boat in Renoir’s 1879 painting, The Seine at Asnières (The Skiff) at the National Gallery, London. Chrome orange was used extensively in Frederic Leighton's Flaming June (1895; Museo de Arte de Ponce).

See also
 List of inorganic pigments

References

Further reading
 Kühn, H. and Curran, M., Chrome Yellow and Other Chromate Pigments, in Artists’ Pigments. A Handbook of Their History and Characteristics, Vol. 1, L. Feller, Ed., Cambridge University Press, London 1986, p. 208 – 211.
 Chrome Orange at ColourLex

Inorganic pigments
Lead(II) compounds
Chromates
Shades of orange